The Zuiko Digital 14–54 mm 2.8–3.5 II is a Four Thirds System Pro series lens by Olympus Corporation, sold in a kit with the Olympus E-30 camera body and available separately. It is positioned just below the Olympus Zuiko Digital ED 12–60mm 1:2.8–4 SWD in terms of size, weight, focusing speed, price and focal length range, while having larger apertures. It replaces the Olympus Zuiko Digital 14–54mm 1:2.8–3.5, which had a longer minimum focusing distance.

As all Pro series lenses by Olympus, it is sealed against water splashes, rain and dust.

External links 
 Official Webpage
 

14-54mm F2.8-3.5 II